Four ships of the Royal Navy have been named HMS Diomede. A fifth was planned but never completed:

 was a 44-gun fourth-rate two-decker launched in 1781 and wrecked in 1795.
 was a 50-gun fourth rate built as HMS Firm but renamed in 1794 and launched in 1798. She was sold in 1815.
HMS Diomede was to have been a wooden screw sloop, projected in 1866 but cancelled in 1867.
 was a  light cruiser launched in 1919 and sold in 1946.
 was a  frigate launched in 1969. She was sold to Pakistan and handed over in 1988, as Shamsher. She served until 2003.

See also
 Diomede (disambiguation)

Royal Navy ship names